is a video game for the Family Computer based on the series Crayon Shin-Chan. It was developed by TOSE and published by Bandai on August 27, 1993, in Japan only. A version of the game was simultaneously released to accommodate the Famicom's Datach Joint Rom System attachment but lacked any features that utilized the Datach's card reading capabilities.

Plot
Each of the game's level stages feature different situations with Shinnosuke involving one of the supporting characters from the series. These situations must be resolved by playing a card game.

Gameplay

The game is a simple card game with a Tetris element. The layout is similar to a Tennis court with both players on either sides defending their goal, while stacks of cards are positioned in the center. Players must move Shin up and down sliding cards, in two's, to the center pile matching up symbols and push each stack back to the opponent's side in an attempt to over take their goal.

References

External links
Crayon Shin-Chan: Ora to Poi Poi at Giant Bomb

1993 video games
Crayon Shin-chan
Bandai games
Tose (company) games
Japan-exclusive video games
Nintendo Entertainment System games
Nintendo Entertainment System-only games
Puzzle video games
Video games based on anime and manga
Video games developed in Japan
Multiplayer and single-player video games